The Belle Bay Formation is a metamorphosed formation cropping out in Newfoundland.

References

Geology of Newfoundland and Labrador